Salt Springs, Nova Scotia could be one of the following communities :

Salt Springs, Antigonish County
Salt Springs, Cumberland County
Salt Springs, Pictou County
Salt Springs Station, Cumberland County

See also
 Salt spring (disambiguation)